"Love Me, I Love You" is the seventeenth single by B'z, released on July 7, 1995. This song is one of B'z many number-one singles in Oricon chart. It sold over 1,393,000 copies according to Oricon, giving their 10th million selling single. B'z became the first artist in Japan to have 10 million sellers consecutively. It was used as the drama Gehai Hiiragi Mata Saburō's theme song.

Track listing 
Love Me, I Love You

Certifications

References

External links
B'z official website

1995 singles
B'z songs
Oricon Weekly number-one singles
Japanese television drama theme songs
Songs written by Tak Matsumoto
Songs written by Koshi Inaba